Central Nahuatl is a group of Nahuatl languages of central Mexico, in the regions of central Puebla, Tlaxcala, central Veracruz, Morelos, Mexico State, and Guerrero.

 Unclear: Classical Nahuatl, Morelos Nahuatl, Tetelcingo Nahuatl
 Tlaxcala-Puebla Nahuatl (border of Puebla and Tlaxcala)
 Central Puebla Nahuatl (Xochiltepec–Huatlatlauca, south of the city of Puebla)
? Southeastern Puebla (see for classification)
 Guerrero Nahuatl (Northern/Central Guerrero, Balsas River region)
 Ometepec Nahuatl (Southern Guerrero)

References 

Nahuatl